Kim Chaek University of Technology is a university in North Korea, on the banks of the Taedong River in Pyongyang. It is named after General Kim Chaek.

The university's programs in nuclear reactors, nuclear electronics, nuclear fuel and nuclear engineering specialize in training researchers and technical personnel. Graduates are reportedly posted to the Yŏngbyŏn Nuclear Research Center or to nuclear facilities in Pakch'ŏn-kun.

History
Kim Chaek University of Technology was originally part of Kim Il Sung University before it was established as the Pyongyang College of Technology (平壤工業大學) in 1948. In 1951, during the Korean War, the college's name was changed to Kim Chaek College of Technology (金策工業大學). (General Kim Ch'aek died in the war.)

In 1988, the college was elevated to a university (綜合大學). Between 1981 and 1993, a large-scale construction program doubled the size of the campus to its present 400,000m2.

Academics
The university has 18 departments (學部) and about 80 programs (學科), about 10,000 students and 2,000 staff. There are 10 research institutes and one graduate school (博士院). There are 54 laboratories and a library with about 600,000 volumes. The campus has a total area of 400,000 square meters.

The Science and Education Department (科學敎育部) under the Korean Workers Party Central Committee (朝鮮勞動黨中央委員會) exercises overall supervision, but the Department of Higher Education (高等敎育部) in the Ministry of Education (敎育省) manages administrative affairs. There are education bureaus under the people's committees in every city and/or province (市·都 人民委員會敎育局) that contribute to the formation of education policy, and the local education bureau could provide some input for the school.

As of 6 January 2007, Ri Won Chil is the vice president.

In 2012, Nosotek cooperated with students from the Kim Chaek University of Technology to develop Pyongyang Racer, a racing video game released by the Koryo Tours travel agency to promote tourism in North Korea.

Achievements 
In 2019 the university placed 8th in 2019's International Collegiate Programming Contest.

Notable alumni 
 Park Jin Hyok,  a North Korean programmer and hacker.

See also 

 List of universities in North Korea
 Education in North Korea

References

Further reading

External links 
 
 E-library at Kim Chaek University of Technology picture album at Naenara
 http://www.nti.org/facilities/757/
 https://www.maxwell.syr.edu/news.aspx?id=36507226699
 

 
Universities in North Korea
Education in Pyongyang
1951 establishments in North Korea
20th-century architecture in North Korea